An election for the Northumberland County Council took place on 6 May 2021 as part of the 2021 local elections in the United Kingdom. All 67 councillors were elected from 66 electoral divisions which returned either one or two county councillors each by first-past-the-post voting for a four-year term of office.

The results saw the Conservative Party win 34 seats, a bare majority.

Results

Council Composition
Following the previous election in 2017, the composition of the council was:

After the election, the composition of the council was:

Ind - Independent 
LD - Liberal Democrats 
G - Green Party

Ward Results

Alnwick

Amble

Amble West with Warkworth

Ashington Central

Bamburgh

Bedlington Central

Bedlington East

Bedlington West

Bellingham

Berwick East

Berwick North

Berwick West with Ord

Bothal

Bywell

Choppington

College

Corbridge

Cowpen

Cramlington East

Cramlington Eastfield

Cramlington North

Cramlington South East

Cramlington Village

Cramlington West

Croft

Druridge Bay

Haltwhistle

Hartley

Haydon & Hadrian

Haydon

Hexham Central with Acomb

Hexham East

Hexham West

Hirst

Holywell

Humshaugh

Isabella

Kitty Brewster

Longhorsley

Longhoughton

Lynemouth

Morpeth Kirkhill

Morpeth North

Morpeth Stobhill

Newbiggin Central & East

Newsham

Norham & Islandshires

Pegswood

Plessey

Ponteland East & Stannington

Ponteland North

Ponteland South with Heddon

Ponteland West

Prudhoe North

Prudhoe South

Rothbury

Seaton with Newbiggin West

Seghill with Seaton Delaval

Shilbottle

Sleekburn

South Blyth

South Tynedale

Stakeford

Stocksfield & Boomhaugh

Wensleydale

Wooler

By-elections

Hexham East

References

Northumberland
Northumberland County Council elections